The Jersey Rockhoppers were a professional ice hockey team based in West Orange, New Jersey, in the United States. They played the 2008–2009 season as members of the Eastern Professional Hockey League and played at the 2,500 seat Richard J. Codey Arena.

The Rockhoppers name was chosen by the team's owners after a name the team contest. The owners decided on an animal name, co-owner Igor Mrotchek stated “We think that Rockhoppers makes a nice match and is identifiable with grace, agility and an aggressive nature compared to other penguins”.

The 2008-09 Rockhoppers were coached by Brian Gratz. On March 28, 2009, the Rockhoppers won the EPHL Championship by defeating the Brooklyn Aces 2 games to 1.

It is said to believe that Rockhoppers Defenseman Alex Hager holds the record for hardest slapshot in the league.

Notable players
On March 21 and 22, 2009, former New York Ranger great, Ron Duguay, suited up to play two games in the EPHL, one game with the Brooklyn Aces and the other with the Jersey Rockhoppers, to raise money for the Garden of Dreams Foundation, a nonprofit organization associated with Madison Square Garden.

Roster

References

External links
 Eastern Professional Hockey League
 Fan Club
 The Internet Hockey Database: Jersey Rockhoppers (EPHL)
 Jersey Rockhoppers

Eastern Professional Hockey League (2008–09) teams
Ice hockey teams in New Jersey
West Orange, New Jersey
2008 establishments in New Jersey
Ice hockey clubs established in 2008